Philip Rudolph Botha (born 15 January 1993 in Johannesburg, South Africa) is a South African rugby union player for the  in the Currie Cup and the Rugby Challenge. His regular position is prop.

Career

Youth and Varsity Cup rugby

He represented them at Under-16 level at the Grant Khomo Week in 2009 and was then included in their Under-18 squad for the premier youth tournament, the Craven Week in both 2010 and 2011, where he was mainly used as a substitute.

However, he impressed enough to be included in the  squad later in 2011, where he made a number of appearances for them during the 2011 Under-19 Provincial Championship. He established himself as a first-choice player for the U19s during the 2012 Under-19 Provincial Championship, making eight appearances.

He progressed to the  side and played nine matches for them during the 2013 Under-21 Provincial Championship, scoring three tries. He got his first taste of Varsity Cup rugby during the 2014 season, playing in three matches for Bloemfontein-based university side . In the second half of 2014, he returned to the Under-21s to play in the 2014 Under-21 Provincial Championship.

Free State Cheetahs

He was an unused member of the  squad for the 2013 Currie Cup Premier Division, but was once again named in their side for the 2014 Currie Cup Premier Division and was included in his first matchday squad when he was named on the bench for their Round Two match against Northern Cape side .

References

1993 births
Living people
Expatriate rugby union players in the United States
Free State Cheetahs players
New England Free Jacks players
Rugby union players from Johannesburg
Rugby union props
South African expatriate rugby union players
South African expatriate sportspeople in the United States